Xanthophryne tigerina, sometimes known as the Amboli toad, is a species of toads. It is endemic to the Western Ghats of India and known only from the vicinity of Amboli in Maharashtra. It was described as a new species in 2009 and placed in a new genus along with its sister species Xanthophryne koynayensis.

Description
This species is medium-sized for a toad, males are smaller (male snout–vent length , female ), somewhat elongated with a broken canthal ridge. They are yellowish with dark stripes on top and sides of the body and lack webbing between the toes and fingers.

Reproduction
Breeding takes place in temporary ponds in cavities within lateritic rock. About 30–35  eggs are laid in a clutch.

Habitat and conservation
This species occurs on the ground in patchy evergreen forest and plantations. It is considered "Critically Endangered" because it is known from a single location only, its habitat is declining in the extent and quality (loss of forest cover), and its abundance is declining.

References

External links

tigerina
Endemic fauna of the Western Ghats
Frogs of India
Amphibians described in 2009
Taxa named by Sathyabhama Das Biju